Robledo may refer to:

Robledo (name)
Robledo (volcano), in Argentina
Robledo, Spain, a municipality in Albacete in Spain
Robledo de Chavela, a municipality in the Community of Madrid, in Spain
Robledo Mountains, in Las Cruces, New Mexico, United States
Robledo, a fictional Southern California town in Octavia E. Butler's novel Parable of the Sower